Coronadoa demisispira is a species of minute sea snail, a marine gastropod mollusc or micromollusc in the family Scissurellidae, the little slit snails.

Distribution
This species occurs in the Pacific Ocean off Santa Catalina Island, California, USA

References

 Geiger D.L. (2012) Monograph of the little slit shells. Volume 1. Introduction, Scissurellidae. pp. 1-728. Volume 2. Anatomidae, Larocheidae, Depressizonidae, Sutilizonidae, Temnocinclidae. pp. 729–1291. Santa Barbara Museum of Natural History Monographs Number 7.

External links
 To Encyclopedia of Life
 To World Register of Marine Species

Scissurellidae
Gastropods described in 2010